Darryl Monroe Jr. (born January 30, 1986) is an American professional basketball player for Anyang KGC of the Korean Basketball League. A power forward/center, he played college basketball for Central Florida CC and George Mason University before playing professionally in the Netherlands, France, Spain, Italy, Israel, Turkey and South Korea. Playing for Maccabi Rishon LeZion, he was named the 2016 Israeli Basketball Premier League MVP, and the 2016 Israeli Basketball Premier League Finals MVP.

Early life and college career
Monroe attended First Colonial High School in Virginia Beach, Virginia. He started his college basketball career with Central Florida Community College, where he averaged 17 points, nine rebounds and five assists in his freshman year.

On November 16, 2005, Monroe transferred from Central Florida to George Mason after receiving interest from more than 40 Division I schools before selecting the Patriots.

In his senior year at George Mason, he averaged 10.5 points, 7.7 rebounds, 2 assists and 1.1 steals per game, leading the CAA in field-goal percentage, second in rebounding and fourth in double-doubles. On March 5, 2009, Monroe was named to the Second-team All-CAA.

Professional career

Aris Leeuwarden (2009–2010)
In 2009, Monroe started his professional career with Aris Leeuwarden of the Dutch Eredivisie, where ranked third in the league in scoring at 16.9 points per game, to go with 7.6 rebounds, 3.3 assists and 1.6 steals, shooting 55.8 percent from the field.

SO Maritime Boulogne (2010–2011)
In 2010, Monroe signed with SO Maritime Boulogne of the French LNB Pro B, where he averaged 12.8 points, 7.8 rebounds, 2.3 assists and 1.5 steals per game, shooting 60 percent from the field. Monroe was ranked in the top 5 in Pro B in rebounding and field-goal percentage. Monroe was a key contributor in an unexpected run by a young Boulogne club to the league semi-finals, including an upset of the highly-touted SPO Rouen Basket. In the Rouen series, Monroe had double-doubles of 24 points and 10 rebounds and 15 points and 11 rebounds to lead the team to its victories.

Boulazac Dordogne (2011–2013)

On July 25, 2011, Monroe signed with Boulazac Basket Dordogne. In 40 games played during the 2011–12 season, he averaged 15.6 points, 9.7 rebounds and 3.3 assists per game. Monroe helped Boulazac promote to the French LNB Pro A as the LNB Pro B runner-up.

In his second season with Boulazac, he averaged 14.7 points and 8.8 rebounds per game. His solid play for the season got him an invite to play in the French Pro A All-Star game in 2013.

ICL Manresa (2013–2014)
On August 14, 2013, Monroe signed with ICL Manresa of the Spanish Liga ACB. In 24 games played during the 2013–14 season, he averaged 13.5 points, 5.8 rebounds and 1.8 assists per game.

Scaligera Verona (2014–2015)
On August 17, 2014, Monroe signed with Scaligera Basket Verona of the Italian Serie A2, the Italian second division, where he was named the MVP of the league after averaging 17.7 points, 9.4 rebounds and 3.3 assists per game, shooting 60 percent from the field. Monroe helped Verona win the Italian LNP Cup after recording a double-double of 19 points and 14 rebounds in the final game against FMC Ferentino.

Maccabi Rishon LeZion (2015–2016)
On August 10, 2015, Monroe signed with Maccabi Rishon LeZion of the Israeli Premier League. On October 30, 2015, Monroe was named Israeli League Player of the Month after averaging 19 points, 10 rebounds, 3.3 assists and 2.7 steals in three games played in October. On February 24, 2016, Monroe recorded a double-double with a season-high 30 points and 13 rebounds, shooting 13-of-19 from the field, along with five assists in an 84–86 loss to Maccabi Ashdod.

Monroe led the league in efficiency rating with 24.2 per game and finished third in rebounds (8.8 per game), he also averaged 17.2 points, 3.6 assists, and 1.7 steals per game. On June 3, 2016, Monroe earned a spot in the All-Israeli League First Team and was named the Israeli League Regular Season MVP.

On June 6, 2016, Monroe recorded 29 points, shooting 14-of-17 from the field, along with six rebounds in the final game against Hapoel Jerusalem, leading Rishon LeZion win its first Israeli League Championship after an 83–77 victory. He was subsequently named the Finals MVP.

Turkey (2016–2018)
On July 27, 2016, Monroe signed with Muratbey Uşak Sportif of the Turkish Basketball Super League. In 8 games played for Uşak, he averaged 13.3 points, 8 rebounds and 1.6 assists per game. On December 16, 2016, Monroe parted ways with Uşak to sign with Türk Telekom for the rest of the season.

In his second season with Türk Telekom, he helped the team promote to the Turkish Basketball Super League as the Turkish First League champions. Monroe averaged 13.9 points, 8.9 rebounds and 3.2 assists per game.

Goyang Orions (2018–2019)
On August 12, 2018, Monroe signed with Goyang Orions of the Korean Basketball League. In 51 games played for the Orions, he averaged 19.5 points, 11.8 rebounds, 5.4 assists and 1.6 steals per game. Monroe helped the Orions reach the KBL Quarterfinals, where they eventually lost to Jeonju KCC Egis.

Return to Rishon LeZion (2019–2021)
On April 5, 2019, Monroe returned to Maccabi Rishon LeZion for a second stint, signing for the rest of the season. Monroe led Rishon LeZion to the 2019 Israeli League Final, where he scored a season-high 22 points in an 89–75 loss to Maccabi Tel Aviv.

On June 29, 2019, Monroe signed a two-year contract extension with Rishon LeZion. He averaged 10.6 points and 6.3 rebounds per game. Monroe re-signed with the team on August 11, 2020.

Anyang KGC (2021–present)
On August 15, 2021, Monroe signed with Anyang KGC of the Korean Basketball League.

Career Statistics

|-
| align="left" |  2015–16
| align="left" | Maccabi Rishon LeZion
| Israeli League
| 40 || 33.7 || .546 || .455 || .677 || 8.9 || 3.6 || 1.8 || .3 || 17.6
|-
| align="left" |  2017–18
| align="left" | Türk Telekom
| Turkish League
| 29 || 30.3 || .629 || .000 || .742 || 9.3 || 3.3 || 1.4 || .4 || 14.4
|-
| align="left" |  2018–19
| align="left" | Goyang Orions
| Korean League
| 51 || 34.2 || .536 || .279 || .696 || 11.9 || 5.5 || 1.7 || .3 || 19.5
|-
| align="left" |  2019–20
| align="left" | Maccabi Rishon LeZion
| Israeli League
| 6 || 29.2 || .403 || .200 || .688 || 7.0 || 3.8 || .5 || .0 || 10.3
|-
|-
| align="left" |  2020–21
| align="left" | Maccabi Rishon LeZion
| Israeli League
| 22 || 32.3 || .576 || .235 || .740 || 7.5 || 3.8 || 1.1 || .1 || 12.4
|-
|-class=sortbottom
| align="center" colspan=2 | Career
| All Leagues
| 148 || 32.8 || .553 || .270 || .699 || 9.7 || 4.2 || 1.5 || .3 || 16.6

References

External links
 RealGM profile
 FIBA profile

1986 births
Living people
American expatriate basketball people in France
American expatriate basketball people in Israel
American expatriate basketball people in Italy
American expatriate basketball people in the Netherlands
American expatriate basketball people in Spain
American expatriate basketball people in South Korea
American expatriate basketball people in Turkey
American men's basketball players
Aris Leeuwarden players
Basketball players from Virginia
Bàsquet Manresa players
Centers (basketball)
Dutch Basketball League players
George Mason Patriots men's basketball players
Goyang Carrot Jumpers players
Junior college men's basketball players in the United States
Liga ACB players
Maccabi Rishon LeZion basketball players
Power forwards (basketball)
Scaligera Basket Verona players
SOMB Boulogne-sur-Mer players
Sportspeople from Virginia Beach, Virginia
Türk Telekom B.K. players
Uşak Sportif players
Anyang KGC players